Anglo-Dutch Treaty may refer to:

 Anglo-Dutch Treaty of 1814, also known as the Convention of London
 Anglo-Dutch Treaty of 1824, also known as the Treaty of London
 Anglo-Dutch Treaties of 1870–1871, three related treaties